MC4 may refer to:

 Medical Communications for Combat Casualty Care, known as MC4
 MC4 connector, electrical connector commonly used for connecting solar panels
 MC4 protein receptor
 Modern Combat 4: Zero Hour known online as MC4
 MC4 (album), second studio album by American rapper French Montana